Joyce Manor is an American punk rock band from Torrance, California, formed in 2008. The band consists of lead vocalist/guitarist Barry Johnson, guitarist Chase Knobbe, and bassist/backing vocalist Matt Ebert. Since their formation, the band have released six studio albums – the most recent of which, 40 oz. to Fresno, was released in June 2022. The band's sound is a mix of power pop, pop punk and emo, with Pitchfork describing the band as writers of "very short songs and spiked alt-rock melodies with day-drunk surrealism, like a SoCal Guided By Voices that exclusively drank alcopops."

Background
The band have drawn inspiration from pop-punk bands such as Blink-182 and emo acts like Weezer, as well as new wave groups such as The Buggles and Orchestral Manoeuvres in the Dark (OMD). The idea for the name "Joyce Manor" was thought of by Barry. It came from the name of an apartment building by frontman Barry Johnson's house. Joyce Manor was originally a duo consisting only of members Johnson and Knobbe, which they first thought of while drunk during a visit to Disneyland. Joyce Manor released a split 7-inch with Summer Vacation in the fall of 2010 via Muy Autentico Records.

They joined 6131 Records in June 2010. Their self-titled full-length debut was released in 2011 to a host of critical and fan praise. Punknews named it their "2011 Album of the Year" and it landed the band on many year-end best-of lists. Joyce Manor moved over to Asian Man Records (and Big Scary Monsters in the UK) for their next album, Of All Things I Will Soon Grow Tired, released in April 2012. This album contains a cover of The Buggles' "Video Killed the Radio Star".

Joyce Manor signed with Epitaph Records to release their third album Never Hungover Again, which was released on 22 July 2014. The album was produced by Joe Reinhart and it features Frances Quinlan from the band Hop Along on the cover. The band received attention within the indie and punk communities for its stance against stage diving after the band interrupted several sets to call out stage divers.

In the fall of 2014, drummer Kurt Walcher was replaced by Jeff Enzor.

In 2016 the band announced their fourth album, Cody, produced by Rob Schnapf. The 10-track release features the single "Fake I.D." and was released on October 7 through Epitaph.

In 2018, the band announced their fifth album Million Dollars to Kill Me by releasing the title track as their first single. The album was released on September 21 through Epitaph Records.

In 2021, the band announced a remastered version of their self-titled album Joyce Manor. The album was released on July 13 through Asian Man Records.

Members 
Current
 Barry Johnson – lead vocals, guitar (2008–present)
 Chase Knobbe – guitar (2008–present)
 Matt Ebert – bass, backing vocals (2009–present)

Current touring musicians
 Neil Berthier – acoustic guitar, synthesizer, backing vocals (2021–present)
 Neil Hennessy – drums (2021–present)Former Jimmy Casey – drums (2008–2009)
 Kurt Walcher – drums (2009–2015)
 Jeff Enzor – drums (2015–2017)
 Pat Ware – drums (2017–2019)

Timeline

 Discography  Studio albums  Joyce Manor (2011)
 Of All Things I Will Soon Grow Tired (2012)
 Never Hungover Again (2014)
 Cody (2016)
 Million Dollars to Kill Me (2018)
 40 oz. to Fresno (2022) Compilations  Collection (2012)
 Songs from Northern Torrance (2020) EPs ' Demo (2009)
 Ew Gross (2009)
 Constant Headache (2009)
 Joyce Manor / Summer Vacation Split EP (2010)
 Joyce Manor / Big Kids Split EP (2012)
 Joyce Manor / Toys That Kill Split EP (2014)
 100% / Joyce Manor Split'' (2017)

Music videos
 "Drainage" / "If I Needed You There" (2012)
 "Catalina Fight Song" (2014)
 "The Jerk" (2014)
 "Fake I.D." (2016)
 "Last You Heard Of Me" (2016)
 "Eighteen" (2016)
 “Million Dollars to Kill Me” (2018)
 “Think I’m Still in Love with You” (2018)
 "Big Lie" (2019)
 “Constant Headache” (2021)
 "Gotta Let It Go" (2022)

References

External links 

 

Asian Man Records artists
Epitaph Records artists
Musical groups established in 2008
Musical quartets
Musicians from Torrance, California
Emo musical groups from California
Pop punk groups from California
Punk rock groups from California
2008 establishments in California
Emo revival groups